is a 1979 fixed shooter arcade video game developed and published by Namco. The player assumes control of the Galaxip starfighter in its mission to protect Earth from waves of aliens. Gameplay involves destroying each formation of aliens, who dive down towards the player in an attempt to hit them.

Designed by company engineer Kazunori Sawano, Galaxian was Namco's answer to Space Invaders, a similar space shooter released the previous year by rival developer Taito. Space Invaders was a sensation in Japan, and Namco wanted a game that could compete against it. Sawano strove to make the game simplistic and easy to understand. He was inspired by the cinematic space combat scenes in Star Wars, with enemies originally being in the shape of the film's TIE Fighters. Galaxian is one of the first video games to feature RGB color graphics and the first ever to use a tile-based hardware system, which was capable of animated multi-color sprites as well as scrolling, though the latter was limited to the starfield background while the game itself remained a fixed shooter.

Galaxian was Namco's first major arcade video game hit. It was the second highest-grossing arcade video game of 1979 and 1980 in Japan and the second highest-grossing of 1980 in the United States, where it became one of the best-selling arcade games of all time with 50,000 arcade units sold by 1982. The game was celebrated for its gameplay and usage of true color graphics. In retrospect, it has gained fame for its historical importance and technological accomplishments. Its success led to several sequels and reimaginings; most notable of these is Galaga, which usurped the original in popularity. Galaxian has also been ported to many home systems and is included in numerous Namco compilations.

Gameplay

Galaxian is a space-themed fixed shooter. The player controls a starship called the "Galaxip", the objective being to clear each round of aliens. The enemies appear in formation towards the top of the screen, with two escort ships, labeled the "Galaxian Flagship" or "Galboss". Enemies will make a divebomb towards the bottom of the screen while shooting projectiles in an attempt to hit the player. The Galaxip can only fire a single shot at a time, and the player must wait for it to either hit an enemy or the top of the screen before being able to fire another, due to limitations of the hardware.

Flagships will make a divebomb with two red escort ships - shooting all three of these will award the player bonus points, with extra points awarded to the destruction of the flagship. Enemy movement will increase as the game progresses alongside the number of shots that the enemies fire. Rounds are indicated by small flags at the bottom of the screen. The game's attract mode featured a slim scenario, reading "WE ARE THE GALAXIANS. MISSION: DESTROY ALIENS".

Development and release
Galaxian was designed by Kazunori Sawano, who had previously worked on many of Namco's electro-mechanical shooting gallery arcade games, notably Shoot Away (1977). Early in the game's development, Taito had released Space Invaders in Japan, which swept the country by storm and helped turn the video game industry into a highly-profitable business. To help capitalize on the game's success, Namco president Masaya Nakamura ordered Sawano to make the best "post-Invaders" game they could, which put a vast amount of pressure on the development team. Although development of the game lasted six months, Sawano had made several ideas half a year before production began.

Sawano and his team set out to make a game anybody could play, using a "simple is best" motto during production – this helped trim away large-scale ideas in favor of a game that could loop endlessly and be able to use only two enemy types. Alongside Space Invaders, a large portion of the game was inspired by Star Wars, specifically its large-scale space battles. Sawano had wanted to replicate the feeling of a space battle, specifically with the game's sound effects. Several back-and-forth sound effects were made, many being rejected by Sawano for not matching his vision. The game was Namco's first arcade game to be composed with a synthesizer.

Game balance was an important part of the game, as Sawano did not want to make the game suddenly spike in difficulty with no build-up or warning; the development team made the number of enemies on-screen the same and gradually increased the difficulty as the player progresses, becoming more noticeable in later stages. The enemies themselves were designed to have a personality of their own, programmed to monitor the player's movements and make attacks based on them - early in development, Sawano had envisioned the enemies to resemble TIE Fighters from Star Wars. To save up on hardware memory and processing, programmers created a tilemap hardware model, which created a set of 8x8 pixel tiles – this reduced processing and memory requirements up to 64 times, compared to the framebuffer model used in Space Invaders. The game's hardware was also capable of features such as multi-color sprites, sprite animation, and scrolling, though the game remained a fixed shooter with a scrolling effect only used for the starfield background.

Galaxian was first released by Namco in Japan on September 15, 1979. Following its large success, Namco approached Midway Manufacturing in terms of releasing the game overseas. Midway, who had previously lost their license with Taito due to the success of Space Invaders in the west, was in the midst of trying to find a new partner for releasing games. After Namco showed Midway the game on October 17, 1979, Midway was interested in the game's unique features and wanted to acquire the rights to the game. They agreed to the deal and released the game in North America in early 1980 – this move helped strengthen Midway and challenged Atari's leadership in the market. To help keep up demand for the game in Japan, Namco licensed the game to other companies for manufacturing cabinets, including Taito and Irem.

Ports

Atari, Inc. published ports of Galaxian for its own systems—Atari 8-bit family, Atari 2600, Atari 5200— in 1982–3, three or more years after Galaxian appeared in arcades and a year or more after Galaga. Additional ports were published under the Atarisoft label: Apple II, ColecoVision, Commodore 64, VIC-20, IBM PC, and ZX Spectrum. Ports from other companies were sold for MSX (Europe and Japan only), NEC PC-8801, Famicom (Japan only), and Sharp X1.

A Bally Astrocade version was published as Galaxian, but the name was later changed to Galactic Invasion.

Coleco released a stand-alone Mini-Arcade tabletop version of Galaxian in 1981,  which, along with Pac-Man, Donkey Kong, and Frogger, sold three million units combined. Entex released a handheld electronic game called Galaxian 2 in 1981. The game is called Galaxian 2 because it has a two-player mode. It is not a sequel, as there is no Entex Galaxian.

Reception

Galaxian was a critical and commercial success upon release. In Japan, it was the second highest-earning arcade game of 1979, below Space Invaders. The following year, Galaxian outperformed Pac-Man for a while, before the year ended with Galaxian again being the second highest-earning arcade game of 1980, below Pac-Man. Galaxian was later the 18th highest-grossing arcade video game of 1981, tied with Defender and Turbo. The game continued to see success in Japan throughout the early 1980s; Game Machine reported that it was still performing well as late as August 1983.

In the United States, Galaxian was also the second highest-grossing arcade game of 1980, below Asteroids, according to Play Meter and Cash Box. Galaxian had sold 40,000 arcade units in the United States by 1981, and 50,000 units in the US .

Reviews
Critics applauded the game's use of true color graphics and for improving the formula established in Space Invaders. The April 5, 1980 issue of Cashbox noted of the game's colorful and attractive cabinet design, while the April 26 issue called it an "earthshaking hit", referring to it as a true followup to Space Invaders. In a 2007 retrospective review, Sir Clive of Eurogamer labeled it a masterpiece, praising its "beautifully drawn" game graphics, intense gameplay, and for being a historically important game for the industry. In 2021, The Guardian listed Galaxian as the greatest video game of the 1970s. In 1996, GamesMaster ranked the arcade version 63 on their "Top 100 Games of All Time."

Home versions and ports of the game received mixed responses by platforms. Video magazine in 1982 reviewed the Astrocade version of Galaxian (named Galactic Invasion), noting that the graphics were inferior to the coin-op and PC versions, but praising the play-action as "magnificent" compared to other console versions. The Astrocade version was later awarded a Certificate of Merit for "Best Arcade-to-Home Video Game Translation" at the 4th annual Arkie Awards. Home Computing Weekly in 1983 gave the Spectrum version of Galaxian 3/5 stars describing it as a well-written version and praising the graphics as fast although flickery. Softline in 1983 criticized the Atari 8-bit version of the game, stating that "this game becomes tedious very quickly".

Legacy

Impact
The Galaxian arcade hardware had a significant influence on the hardware design of Nintendo's later arcade and console systems, including the arcade hardware for Radar Scope (1980) and Donkey Kong (1981) as well as the Nintendo Entertainment System (NES). According to Nintendo R&D2 lead engineer Masayuki Uemura, Galaxian replaced the more intensive bitmap rendering system of Space Invaders with a hardware sprite rendering system that animated sprites over a scrolling background, allowing more detailed graphics, faster gameplay and a scrolling animated starfield background. This provided the basis for Nintendo's Radar Scope arcade hardware, which improved on Galaxian with technology such as high-speed emitter-coupled logic (ECL) integrated circuit (IC) chips and memory on a 50 MHz printed circuit board. Following the commercial failure of Radar Scope, the game's arcade hardware was converted for use with Donkey Kong, which became a major arcade hit. Home systems at the time were not powerful enough to handle an accurate port of Donkey Kong, so Nintendo wanted to create a system that allowed a fully accurate conversion of Donkey Kong to be played in homes, leading to the development of the NES.

Sequels
Galaxian spawned a long series of sequels and spin-offs for multiple game platforms, including arcade hardware and home video game systems. The first of these, Galaga, was released in 1981, usurping the original in popularity as one of the greatest video games of all time, becoming a popular game during the golden age of arcade video games in North America. It was followed by Gaplus in 1984, which added power-up items and juggling-based bonus stages. Galaga '88 was released in 1987, published in North America by Atari Games, which featured branching level paths, new enemy types and multiple endings.

In 1990, Namco produced a theme-park attraction based on the series, Galaxian3: Project Dragoon. Originally presented at Expo '90 and moved to Namco's Wonder Eggs theme park two years later, it was a rail shooter where up to 28 players used lightguns to shoot down enemies and projectiles. A smaller version for arcades was released in 1992, followed by a 1996 PlayStation release in Japan and Europe. In 1995, an arcade remake of Galaga was released for the Namco Classic Collection Vol. 1 compilation, Galaga Arrangement. This game added two-player co-operative play and boss fights, alongside new enemy and weapon types. It was ported to the Xbox, PlayStation 2 and GameCube in 2002 as part of the compilation disk Namco Museum.

A Japan-only medal game spin-off, Galaxian Fever, was released in 2000 as part of Namco's Shooting Medal series. The following year, Hasbro Interactive released Galaga: Destination Earth for the PlayStation and Game Boy Color, adding side-scrolling and third-person stages to the core gameplay. The 2005 PlayStation Portable compilation Namco Museum Battle Collection includes a remake of Galaga titled Galaga Arrangement, having no relation to the one featured in Namco Classic Collection Vol. 1. This game was later ported to iOS devices in 2009, renamed Galaga Remix. In 2008, Namco Bandai Games released a downloadable game for the Xbox 360 and PlayStation 3, Galaga Legions – this game was instead a twin-stick shooter game with score attack modes and multiple stages. It was followed by a 2011 sequel, Galaga Legions DX, branded under the now-defunct Namco Generations label.

Re-releases
Galaxian is included in the Namco Museum series of collections across several platforms.

Galaxian and Galaga were bundled together for a Game Boy release as Arcade Classic 3.

Galaxian was released on Microsoft Windows in 1995 as part of Microsoft Return of Arcade.

The game was also released as part of the Pac-Man's Arcade Party 30th Anniversary arcade machine.

The game has also been seen in Jakks Pacific's "Plug It In & Play" TV game controllers.

Galaxian, along with Galaga, Gaplus, and Galaga '88, was "redesigned and modernized" for an iPhone app compilation called the Galaga 30th Anniversary Collection, released in commemoration of the event by Namco Bandai.

Super Impulse also released a stand-alone Tiny Arcade version of Galaxian.

In the competitive arena
The Galaxian world record has been the focus of many competitive gamers since its release. The most famous Galaxian rivalry has been between British player Gary Whelan and American Perry Rodgers, who faced off at Apollo Amusements in Pompano Beach, Florida, USA, on 6–9 April 2006. Whelan held the world record with 1,114,550 points, until beaten by newcomer Aart van Vliet, of the Netherlands, who scored 1,653,270 points on 27 May 2009 at the Funspot Family Fun Center in Weirs Beach, New Hampshire, USA. The record has since been raised to 2,010,000 points, set on 20 May 2016 by David Lyne and verified by Twin Galaxies on 28 May 2016.

Notes

References

External links

 
 

1979 video games
Apple II games
Arcade video games
Atari 2600 games
Atari 5200 games
Atari 8-bit family games
ColecoVision games
Commodore 64 games
VIC-20 games
Bandai Namco Entertainment franchises
Famicom Disk System games
Fixed shooters
FM-7 games
Java platform games
Galaxian
Game Boy Color games
Midway video games
Mobile games
MSX games
Namco arcade games
NEC PC-6001 games
NEC PC-8001 games
NEC PC-8801 games
Nintendo Entertainment System games
Nintendo Switch games
PlayStation 4 games
Sharp X1 games
Video game franchises
Video games developed in Japan
Virtual Console games
ZX Spectrum games
Hamster Corporation games